Sir Michael John Tomlinson CBE (born 17 October 1942 in Rotherham) is the chair of the Working Group for 14–19 Reform which has been commissioned by the British Government to look into reform of the syllabus and qualifications structure for 14- to 19-year-olds in the English education system.

Early life
He passed the 11-plus and attended the Oakwood Technical High School (now the Oakwood Technology College) in Rotherham and Bournemouth Boys' School (a grammar school).

He studied for a BSc in chemistry at the University of Durham before going on to do a Postgraduate Certificate in Education at the University of Nottingham, followed by 12 years in the classroom as a science teacher, including some time on secondment to Imperial Chemical Industries as a schools liaison officer in 1977.

Career

Teaching
He was a chemistry teacher at the Henry Mellish Grammar School (now called Henry Mellish School and Specialist Sports College) on Highbury Road in Bulwell, Nottingham from 1965 to 1969. From 1969 to 1977, he was head of chemistry at Ashby-de-la-Zouch Grammar School (a comprehensive school and now called Ashby School) in Leicestershire.

Education administration
In 1978 he joined Her Majesty's Inspectorate of Schools (now Ofsted) and, in this capacity, helped to re-establish the education system in Kuwait following the first Gulf War. In 1989, he became chief inspector (secondary). In November 2000 when Chris Woodhead resigned, he became Chief Inspector of Schools, a post which he held until his retirement in 2002.

Retirement
Shortly after his retirement, he led an enquiry (the Tomlinson Enquiry) into the controversy surrounding A-level grading, and was then appointed chair of the 14–19 Working Group in 2003. He is also a governor of the University of Hertfordshire, a member of the boards of the Qualifications and Curriculum Authority and the National Assessment Agency, a member of the Public Engagement group of the Science Museum, and a fellow and a member of the council of the Royal Society of Arts. Since 2008, he has been chief adviser for London Schools in the Department for Children, Schools and Families.

Recognition
In 1997 he was made a CBE. Tomlinson was made a knight in the New Year's Honours list of 31 December 2004.

Personal life
In 1965 he married Maureen Janet Tupling in Rotherham. They have a son (born 1968) and a daughter (born 1970). His children initially went to comprehensive schools, but later went to grammar schools.

External links
 Working Group on 14–19 Reform
 Qualifications and Curriculum Authority
 The RSA
 The Science Museum
 Interview with Sir Mike Tomlinson 2008
 Honorary doctorate from the University of Wolverhampton

News items
 BBC Profile September 2002
 Independent article April 2002
 Independent article February 2001

1942 births
Living people
People from Rotherham
Alumni of the University of Nottingham
Alumni of Durham University
People educated at Bournemouth School
People associated with the University of Hertfordshire
Commanders of the Order of the British Empire
Knights Bachelor
Schoolteachers from Nottinghamshire
Civil servants in the Department of Education (United Kingdom)
Civil servants in the Department for Education and Employment
Civil servants in the Department for Education and Skills
Civil servants in the Department for Children, Schools and Families
English educational theorists
People associated with the Science Museum, London
Schoolteachers from Leicestershire